"Shock" is a song by American new wave band The Motels, which was released in 1985 as the second single from their fifth studio album Shock. The song was written by Martha Davis and Scott Thurston, and produced by Richie Zito. "Shock" peaked at number 84 on the US Billboard Hot 100.

Music video
The song's music video was directed by David Fincher. It achieved light rotation on MTV.

Critical reception
On its release, Billboard noted the "clean, sharp dance sound, with Davis squarely out front". Cash Box described it as a "heavily percussive cut" which "has all the raw urgency and dynamic tension [of] this band's uptempo tunes". In a review of Shock, J. A. White of The Morning Call considered it to have "a basic, hard Pat Benatar-like sound with some Michael Jackson touches and oriental synth-funk embellishments here and there".

Track listing
7–inch single
"Shock" (Remix) – 4:09
"In the Jungle (Concrete Jungle)" – 3:59

7–inch promotional single (US)
"Shock" (Remix) – 4:09
"Shock" (Remix) – 4:09

12–inch single (France)
"Shock" – 6:51
"Shock" (Instrumental) – 5:41

12–inch promotional single (US)
"Shock" – 4:27
"Shock" – 4:27

Personnel
Credits are adapted from the Shock LP inner sleeve notes and 12-inch single sleeve notes.

The Motels
 Martha Davis – vocals
 Marty Jourard – keyboards
 Michael Goodroe – bass
 Brian Glascock – drums
 Guy Perry – guitar
 Scott Thurston – keyboards, guitar

Production
 Richie Zito – producer (all tracks), remixer ("Shock")
 Brian Reeves – engineer on "Shock"
 Steve Thompson, Michael Barbiero - remixers (12-inch extended mix of "Shock")

Charts

References

1985 songs
1985 singles
Capitol Records singles
Songs written by Martha Davis (musician)
Song recordings produced by Richie Zito